Sombat Banchamek (born May 8, 1982) a.k.a. Buakaw Banchamek (Buakaw meaning "white lotus") is a martial artist from Thailand of ethnic Kuy descent, who formerly fought out of Por. Pramuk Gym, in Bangkok, Thailand, under the ring name Buakaw Por. Pramuk.  He competes in the sports of Muay Thai, kickboxing 

He is a former two-time Omnoi Stadium champion, Lumpinee Stadium Toyota Marathon champion, former #1-ranked fighter in Lumpinee Stadium, Thailand Featherweight champion, two-time K-1 World MAX champion and 2011 & 2012 Thai Fight tournament champion.

Buakaw also briefly played professional football as a forward in the Regional League Division 2 for RBAC F.C.

Additionally, he has also embarked on an acting career, starring in 2010's Yamada: The Samurai of Ayothaya and 2017's Thong Dee Fun Khao after University graduate.

Buakaw is regarded as one of the best kickboxers that Thailand has ever produced.

Biography and career

Early career
Born as Sombat Banchamek in Surin, Thailand, Buakaw started his fighting career at the age of eight in his home province of Surin in the northeastern Thailand. He moved to Chachoengsao when he was 15 and trained with the Por. Pramuk Gym. His first fight name was Damtamin Kiat-anan.

Buakaw has collected several belts to his name fighting in Bangkok. The Omnoi Stadium featherweight title was his first belt. After that, he would go on to take the featherweight champion of Thailand title. Buakaw then proceeded to win another Omnoi Stadium title belt, this time in the lightweight division. In December 2002, Buakaw won the Toyota Marathon 140 lb. tournament at Lumpinee Boxing Stadium, beating the highly regarded Satoshi Kobayashi of Japan in the finals.

K-1
In July 2004, Buakaw became the K-1 MAX World champion beating John Wayne Parr, Takayuki Kohiruimaki and previous champion Masato in the finals. In 2005, he nearly repeated his run for tournament champion but lost the extra round in a controversial decision to Dutch shoot-boxer Andy Souwer in the finals. In the 2006 K-1 MAX World Grand Prix, Buakaw again faced Andy Souwer in the finals but this time defeated Souwer by TKO with a flurry of punches; thereby winning his second K-1 World MAX title and becoming the first man to win such title twice.

Buakaw lost to Masato by unanimous decision at the K-1 World MAX 2007 quarterfinals. Despite Buakaw being able to land vicious leg kicks throughout the match, Masato scored a knockdown in the first round and continued to land numerous punch combinations throughout the fight which earned him a unanimous decision victory.

In 2010, Buakaw co-starred in the martial arts movie Yamada: The Samurai of Ayothaya based on the life of Yamada Nagamasa, a Japanese adventurer who gained considerable influence in Thailand at the beginning of the 17th century and became the governor of the Nakhon Si Thammarat province in southern Thailand.

Although Buakaw was a semi-finalist of the K-1 World MAX 2009 Final Buakaw did not compete in the K-1 World MAX 2010 in Seoul World Championship Tournament Final 16 because he was displeased with the K-1 official's biased decision. Instead he entered the Shoot Boxing World Tournament 2010 along with the former three time tournament champion Andy Souwer. However Toby Imada defeated Souwer in the semi finals to face Buakaw in the final. Buakaw defeated Imada via TKO in the second round to become the new 2010 Shoot Boxing S-Cup World champion.

Thai Fight
In 2011, Buakaw had seven fights; four of which ended by way of stoppage. In the semi-finals of the 2011 Thai Fight 70 kg Tournament, he won by KO in the 3rd round via elbow against Mickael Piscitello. On December 18, 2011, he fought Frank Giorgi for the 2011 Thai Fight 70 kg Tournament Title and won by unanimous decision.

In the same year, Buakaw was signed as a sponsored fighter by Yokkao founder, Phillip Villa. He led the Muay Thai Combat Fan Expo to showcase the sport in Rimini, Italy with Saenchai, Sudsakorn Sor Klinmee, Dzhabar Askerov and many others.

Leaving Por. Pramuk, retirement and comeback

On January 21, 2012, Buakaw headlined Yokkao Extreme 2012 in Milan Italy in front of 12,000 attendees. He defeated Dzhabar Askerov by points in the main event.

On March 1, 2012, he was notably absent from his training camp. On March 12, he appeared on a Thai TV talk show to apologize to the fans and explain his disappearance, stating that he had recurring problems in Por. Pramuk Gym since 2009 and felt insulted by the behavior of the management there. He had been scheduled to visit Japan with the Prime Minister Yingluck Shinawatra for an exhibition match but it was canceled in favor of another fight. As a result of the complication, he decided to part ways with the gym. He said "I can stand tough training, but not poor treatment. It is about the mind, not the body."

On March 17, 2012, Buakaw's sponsor Yokkao Boxing announced that he would return to training. It was at this time that they began referring to him as Buakaw Banchamek. He had resumed training at the "newly-built" Banchamek gym (named after him), as of March 22, 2012. He was scheduled to fight Mickael Cornubet at ThaiFight on April 17, 2012.

On March 30, 2012, Buakaw was prevented from fighting at Thai Fight in April 2012, until he filed a complaint with the Sports Authority of Thailand proving his claims of unfair treatment by Por. Pramuk. On April 4, he said that his fight name for the fight later that month would be "Buakaw", and that he "may not use the name of the boxing camp Por. Pramuk."

Buakaw's first fight after leaving Por Pramuk Gym was a success. He knocked out Rustem Zaripov at 2:45 of the 2nd round with accurate punches. On May 31, 2012, Buakaw told the press that he wanted to end the dispute between him and Por. Pramuk Gym. For a time, Buakaw was seen in jiujitsu, judo, and wrestling classes. An MMA career would have allowed Buakaw to fight without breaching his contract with the Por. Pramuk boxing camp. Nevertheless, Buakaw returned to the ring on August 17, 2012, when he defeated Abdoul Toure by way of TKO in round 2.

Buakaw beat Mauro Serra via TKO in the quarter-finals of the 2012 Thai Fight 70 kg Tournament at Thai Fight 2012: King of Muay Thai in Bangkok, Thailand, on October 23, 2012. He then defeated Tomoyuki Nishikawa by unanimous decision in the tournament semi-finals in Nakhon Ratchasima on November 25, 2012. He fought Vitaly Gurkov in the final on December 16, 2012, and won the Thai Fight tournament via decision.

On March 27, 2013, Buakaw faced his friend and teammate Harlee Avison in a staged exhibition match, which was free to the public, at the brand new Beeline Arena in Cambodia. On May 6, 2013, Buakaw again went off script to KO Malik Watson in round two in an exhibition match at MAX Muay Thai 1 in Surin, Thailand.

Buakaw made his return to legitimate fighting with a decision win over Dong Wen Fei in a three-round kickboxing match at MAX Muay Thai 3 in China on August 10, 2013. He re-signed with K-1 in August 2013 and returned with a first round body shot KO of David Calvo at the K-1 World MAX 2013 World Championship Tournament Final 16 in Mallorca, Spain on September 14, 2013. In their fourth meeting, Buakaw bested Yoshihiro Sato on points at MAX Muay Thai 4 in Sendai, Japan on October 6, 2013. He beat Enriko Kehl by decision at MAX Muay Thai 5: The Final Chapter in Khon Kaen, Thailand on December 10, 2013.

Buakaw defeated Zhou Zhi Peng on points after an extension round at the K-1 World MAX 2013 World Championship Tournament Quarter Finals - Part 1 in Foshan, China on December 28, 2013. Zhou attempted to turn the fight into a brawl, and despite Buakaw doing enough to win the decision, the judges sent it to an extra round in which Buakaw suffered a cut from a head butt. In spite of this, Buakaw was able to establish dominance to take the fight and advance in the tournament. At the K-1 World MAX 2013 World Championship Tournament Final 4 in Baku, Azerbaijan, on February 23, 2014, he beat Lee Sung-Hyun by unanimous decision in the semi-finals.

Buakaw beat Victor Nagbe via unanimous decision at Combat Banchamek in Surin, Thailand, on April 14, 2014. He knocked out Adaylton Parreira De Freitas in round two at Muay Thai in Macau on June 6, 2014. Buakaw was scheduled to fight Fabio Pinca for the vacant WMC World Junior Middleweight (-69.9 kg/154 lb) Championship at Monte Carlo Fighting Masters 2014 in Monte Carlo, Monaco, on June 14, 2014. However, Pinca was injured in a bout with Thongchai Sitsongpeenong in February and was replaced by Djime Coulibaly. Buakaw defeated Coulibaly via unanimous decision to take the belt.

Buakaw was initially set to rematch Enriko Kehl in the K-1 World MAX 2013 World Championship Tournament Final in Pattaya, Thailand, on 26 July 2014. However, the event was postponed due to the 2014 Thai coup d'état. On 12 October 2014 he lost to Kehl by forfeit in the K-1 World Max Final event in Pattaya.

Buakaw lost the TopKing World Series Semifinal Tournament (TK4) against Russian fighter Khayal Dzhaniev in a controversial decision. Many Muay Thai journalists have stated that Buakaw should have won the match. Buakaw also suffered from deep cuts in his head inflicted by Khayal's elbows while Khayal suffered broken ribs. Khayal was later hospitalized upon being forced to forfeit the final match that same night.

Kunlun Fight 2017

Buakaw fought Chinese fighter Kong Lingfeng in the main event at Kunlun Fight 62 on June 10, 2017, in Bangkok, Thailand. He won the fight by decision.

Buakaw was expected to headline the debut of Kunlun Fight in France on November 11 in Paris. The event didn't happen and Buakaw fought in China at Kunlun Fight 67 where he knocked out Dutch Maroun Toutouh in the second round with punches.

All Star Fight
Buakaw defeated French Azize Hlali by knockout in the first round in the headline bout at All Star Fight on August 20, 2017 in Bangkok, Thailand.

On September 30 Buakaw scored the decision against Sergey Kuliaba of Ukraine at All Star Fight 2 in Bangkok 

On December 10 Buakaw was expected to fight Fabio Pinca at All Star Fight 3 held in Paris, but the Frenchman pulled out after suffering the knockout defeat against Uzbekistan's Anvar Boynazarov at Glory 47 Lyon on October 28, 2017.

2018 
Buakaw faced Nayanesh Ayman in China at Kunlun Fight 69 on February 4, 2018, where he won via first-round knockout.

Buakaw is expected to challenge Spanish Jonay Risco for 70 kg title on March 9, 2018 at Enfusion kickboxing promotion in Abu Dhabi.

Buakaw fought Portuguese Luis Passos on 28 of April 2018 on All Star Fight 3 in Bangkok Thailand where he won via unanimous decision.

He fought three more times in 2018 on All Star Fight events held in Hong Kong, Prague and Pattaya respectively. He won on all three occasions by points.

2019 
Buakaw headlined All Star Fight: World Soldier on March 9, 2019 in Bangkok Thailand. The show was organized in partnership with the Royal Thai Army to promote the national sport of Muay Thai as well as the fighters, several of whom are soldiers including Buakaw. He fought against Russian kickboxer, Artem Pashporin and won by unanimous decision.

Buakaw was scheduled to face Chris Ngimbi at MAS Fight Kun Khmer under MAS Fight rules (1 round of 9 minutes) on October 27, 2019 in Phnom Penh, Cambodia. He defeated Ngimbi by technical knockout at 4:10 of the fight.

2022  
After a nearly three-year-long hiatus, Buakaw made his return to competition against Dmitry Varats at World Fight Tournament in Phnom Penh, Cambodia on July 6, 2022. He won the fight via unanimous decision.

Bare-knuckle boxing

Bare Knuckle Fighting Championship 
On July 13th 2022 it was announced by David Feldman, President and Founder of Bare Knuckle Fighting Championship, that Buakaw had signed a deal to fight for BKFC. He made his debut headlining BKFC Thailand 3: Moment of Truth on September 3, 2022, where he defeated Erkan Varol by first-round knockout.

On October 26, 2022, it was announced that Buakaw is scheduled to face Muay Thai legend Saenchai in a bare-knuckle Muay Thai bout on March 2023 at a BKFC event.

Football career

RBAC
Buakaw enrolled in Rattana Bundit University's business administration, he graduated in 2016 . In February 2014, he signed for RBAC F.C., the association football club representing Rattana Bundit University, which plays in the Regional League Division 2 and is the reserve team of BEC Tero Sasana F.C., who plays in the Thai Premier League. Buakaw is a graduate of Rattana Bundit University (RBAC). Playing as a forward, he made his debut on February 16.

Village
He has a village project in the Chiang Mai Province of Thailand called Buakaw Village, it contains a muay thai gym, a restaurant, and bungalows that can be rented by people who come to train at the muay thai gym.

Titles

Kickboxing
K-1
2014 K-1 World MAX Championship Tournament Runner Up 
2006 K-1 World MAX Champion
2005 K-1 World MAX Runner Up
2004 K-1 World MAX Champion
Wu Lin Feng
2015 Wu Lin Feng 70 kg World Championship

Muay Thai
Omnoi Stadium
2001 Omnoi Stadium Featherweight Champion
2002 Omnoi Stadium Lightweight Champion
Professional Boxing Association of Thailand
2001 Thailand (PAT) Featherweight Champion
Toyota Cup
2002 Toyota Muay Thai Marathon Tournament 140 lbs Champion
World Muaythai Council
2014-2015 WMC Muaythai Junior Middleweight World Champion
2011 WMC Muaythai Junior Middleweight World Champion
2009 WMC/MAD Muaythai Super Welterweight World Champion
2006-2007 WMC Muaythai Super Welterweight World Champion 
WBC Muay Thai
2014 WBC Muaythai Diamond World Championship
Thai Fight
2012 Thai Fight 70 kg Tournament Champion
2011 Thai Fight 70 kg Tournament Champion
11–0 record 
S-1 Muaythai
2005 S-1 Super Welterweight World Champion
Muay Thai Association
2005 MTA World Champion
Kunlun Fight
2016 Kunlun Fight Muaythai Middleweight World Championship
Phoenix Fighting Championship
2016 PFC Junior Middle Weight Championship
King of Martial Arts
2003 KOMA GP Lightweight Champion

Shoot Boxing
S-cup
2010 Shoot Boxing S-Cup World champion

Accomplishments
LiverKick.com
2013 LiverKick.com Comeback of the Year

Fight record

|-  style="background:#cfc;"
| 2022-07-06 || Win ||align=left| Dmitry Varats || World Fight Kun Khmer Series || Phnom Penh, Cambodia || Decision (Unanimous) || 3 || 3:00
|-  style="background:#cfc;"
| 2019-10-27 || Win ||align=left| Chris Ngimbi || MAS Fight Kun Khmer || Phnom Penh, Cambodia || TKO (Referee stoppage) || 1 || 4:10
|-  style="background:#cfc;"
| 2019-03-09|| Win ||align=left| Artem Pashporin || All Star Fight 8||Thailand || Decision (Unanimous)|| 3 || 3:00
|-  style="background:#cfc;"
| 2019-01-27 || Win ||align=left| Niclas Larsen || All Star Fight 7 || Phuket, Thailand || TKO (Referee stoppage) || 3 || 3:00
|-  style="background:#cfc;"
| 2018-11-04 || Win ||align=left|  Gaetan Dambo|| All Star Fight 6 || Pattaya, Thailand || Decision (Unanimous) || 3 || 3:00
|-  style="background:#cfc;"
| 2018-07-06 || Win ||align=left|  Michael Krcmar|| All Star Fight 5 || Prague, Czech Republic || Decision (Unanimous) || 3 || 3:00
|-  style="background:#cfc;"
| 2018-05-21 || Win ||align=left| Victor Nagbe || All Star Fight 4 || Hong Kong || Decision (Unanimous) || 3 || 3:00
|-  style="background:#cfc;"
| 2018-04-28 || Win ||align=left| Luis Passos || All Star Fight 3 || Bangkok, Thailand || Decision (Unanimous) || 3 || 3:00
|-  style="background:#fbb;"
| 2018-03-05 || Loss||align=left| Jonay Risco || Enfusion 63 || Abu Dhabi || Decision|| 5 || 3:00
|-
! style=background:white colspan=9 |
|-  style="background:#cfc;"
| 2018-02-04 || Win ||align=left| Nayanesh Ayman || Kunlun Fight 69 || Guiyang, China || KO (Left Hook) || 1 || 2:06
|-  style="background:#cfc;"
| 2017-11-12 || Win ||align=left| Marouan Toutouh || Kunlun Fight 67 || Sanya, China || KO (Left Hook) || 2 || 1:03
|-  style="background:#cfc;"
| 2017-09-30 || Win ||align=left| Sergey Kulyaba || All Star Fight 2 || Bangkok, Thailand || Decision (Unanimous) || 3 || 3:00
|-
|-  style="background:#cfc;"
| 2017-08-20 || Win ||align=left| Azize Hlali || All Star Fight || Bangkok, Thailand || KO (Left Hook) || 1 || 2:52
|-
|-  style="background:#cfc;"
| 2017-06-11 || Win ||align=left| Kong Lingfeng || Kunlun Fight 62 || Bangkok, Thailand || Decision (Unanimous) || 3 || 3:00
|-
|-  style="background:#cfc;"
| 2017-01-01 || Win ||align=left| Tian Xin || Kunlun Fight 56 || Sanya, China || Decision (Unanimous) || 3 || 3:00
|-
|-  style="background:#cfc;"
| 2016-12-10 || Win ||align=left| Andrei Kulebin || Phoenix Fighting Championship || Zouk Mikael, Lebanon || Decision (Unanimous) || 3 || 3:00 
|-
! style=background:white colspan=9 |
|-  style="background:#fbb;"
| 2016-11-05 || Loss ||align="left"| Yi Long || Wu Lin Feng 2016: Fight of the Century || Zhengzhou, China || Decision (Unanimous)|| 3 || 3:00 
|-
! style=background:white colspan=9 |
|-  style="background:#cfc;"
| 2016-09-24 || Win ||align=left| Dylan Salvador || Kunlun Fight 53 - Muay Thai 70kg Championship || Beijing, China || Decision || 3 || 3:00 
|-
! style=background:white colspan=9 |
|-  style="background:#cfc;"
| 2016-06-05 || Win ||align=left| Wang Weihao || Kunlun Fight 45 || Chengdu, China || TKO (Right High Kick)  || 1 || 2:35
|-  style="background:#cfc;"
| 2016-03-20 || Win ||align=left| Kong Lingfeng || Kunlun Fight 39 || Dongguan, China || Decision (Unanimous) || 3 || 3:00 
|-  style="background:#cfc;"
| 2016-01-09 || Win ||align=left| Liu Hainan || Kunlun Fight 36 || Shanghai, China || Decision (Unanimous) || 3 || 3:00 
|-  style="background:#cfc;"
| 2015-10-28 || Win ||align=left| Gu Hui || Kunlun Fight 32 || Dazhou, China || TKO (knees)|| 2 || 1:54 
|-  style="background:#fbb;"
| 2015-07-28 || Loss ||align=left| Khayal Dzhaniev || Topking World Series 4 – 70 kg Tournament, Semi Finals  || Hong Kong, China || Decision || 3 || 3:00 
|-  style="background:#cfc;"
| 2015-07-01 || Win ||align=left| Artem Pashporin || T-one Muay Thai 2015  || Beijing, China ||Decision (Unanimous) || 3 || 3:00
|-  style="background:#cfc;"
| 2015-06-06 || Win ||align=left|  Yi Long || Wu Lin Feng 2015 – Fight of the Century || Jiyuan, China ||  Decision (Unanimous) || 3 || 3:00
|-
! style=background:white colspan=9 |
|-  style="background:#cfc;"
| 2015-05-02 ||Win ||align=left| Yuan Bin || Quanwei WMC Muaythai International Title 2015  || Xiamen, China || Decision || 3 || 3:00
|-
! style=background:white colspan=9 |
|-  style="background:#cfc;"
| 2014-12-20 || Win ||align=left| Dmytro Konstantinov || Topking World Series 3 – 70 kg Tournament, Quarter Finals || Hong Kong, China || Decision (unanimous) || 3 || 3:00
|-  style="background:#cfc;"
| 2014-11-15 || Win ||align=left| Steve Moxon || Topking World Series 2 || Paris, France || TKO (elbow) || 3 || 1:07
|-  style="background:#fbb;"
| 2014-10-11 || Loss ||align=left| Enriko Kehl || K-1 World MAX 2014 World Championship Tournament Final || Pattaya, Thailand || Forfeit (Left before announcement of the 4th) || 4 || 0:00
|-
! style=background:white colspan=9 |
|-  style="background:#cfc;"
| 2014-09-13 || Win ||align=left| Zhang Chunyu || Topking World Series - 70 kg Tournament, Final 16 || Minsk, Belarus || Decision (unanimous) || 3 || 3:00
|-  style="background:#cfc;"
| 2014-08-15 || Win ||align=left| Abdoul Touré || Chiang Rai WBC Muaythai Championship || Chiang Rai, Thailand || TKO (Right cross elbow) || 3 || 0.44
|-
! style=background:white colspan=9 |
|-  style="background:#cfc;"
| 2014-06-14 || Win ||align=left| Djime Coulibaly || Monte Carlo Fighting Masters 2014 || Monte Carlo, Monaco || Decision (unanimous) || 5 || 3:00
|-
! style=background:white colspan=9 |
|-  style="background:#cfc;"
|2014-06-06 || Win || align=left| Adaylton Freitas || Muay Thai in Macau || Macau || KO (Left High Kick)|| 2 || 1:12 
|-  style="background:#cfc;"
|2014-04-14 || Win || align=left| Victor Nagbe || Combat Banchamek || Surin, Thailand || Decision (unanimous) || 3 || 3:00
|-  style="background:#cfc;"
|2014-02-23 || Win || align=left| Lee Sung-Hyun || K-1 World MAX 2013 Final 4|| Baku, Azerbaijan || Decision (unanimous) || 3 || 3:00
|-
! style=background:white colspan=9 |
|-  style="background:#cfc;"
| 2013-12-28 || Win ||align=left| Zhou Zhipeng || K-1 World MAX 2013 Quarter Finals || Foshan, China || Extension round decision || 4 || 3:00
|-
! style=background:white colspan=9 |
|-  style="background:#cfc;"
| 2013-12-10 || Win ||align=left| Enriko Kehl || MAX Muay Thai 5: The Final Chapter || Khon Kaen, Thailand || Decision || 3 || 3:00
|-  style="background:#cfc;"
| 2013-10-06 || Win ||align=left| Yoshihiro Sato || MAX Muay Thai 4 || Sendai, Japan || Decision || 3 || 3:00
|-  style="background:#cfc;"
| 2013-09-14 || Win ||align=left| David Calvo || K-1 World MAX 2013 Final 16|| Mallorca, Spain || KO (left hook to the body) || 1 || 2:20
|-
! style=background:white colspan=9 |
|-  style="background:#cfc;"
| 2013-08-10 || Win ||align=left| Dong Wenfei || Wu Lin Feng & MAX Muay Thai 3 || Zhengzhou, China || Decision (2-1) || 3 || 3:00 
|-  style="background:#cfc;"
| 2013-05-06 ||  Win || align=left| Malik Watson || MAX Muay Thai 1 || Surin, Thailand || KO || 2 || 
|-  style="background:#cfc;"
| 2012-12-16 || Win ||align=left| Vitaly Gurkov || THAI FIGHT 2012 - King of Muay Thai Tournament Finals || Bangkok, Thailand || Decision || 3 || 3:00 
|-
! style=background:white colspan=9 |
|-  style="background:#cfc;"
| 2012-11-25 || Win ||align=left| Tomoyuki Nishikawa || THAI FIGHT 2012 - King of Muay Thai Tournament 2nd Round || Nakhon Ratchasima, Thailand || Decision (unanimous) || 3 || 3:00
|-
! style=background:white colspan=9 |
|-  style="background:#cfc;"
| 2012-10-23 || Win ||align=left| Mauro Serra || THAI FIGHT 2012 - King of Muay Thai Tournament 1st Round || Bangkok, Thailand || TKO (right knee to the body) || 3 || 
|-
! style=background:white colspan=9 |
|-  style="background:#cfc;"
| 2012-08-17 || Win ||align=left| Toure Abdoul || THAI FIGHT EXTREME 2012: England || Leicester, England || TKO (Right Knee to the Body) || 2 || 1:02
|-  style="background:#cfc;"
| 2012-04-17 || Win ||align=left| Rustem Zaripov || THAI FIGHT EXTREME 2012: Pattaya || Pattaya, Thailand || KO (Punches) ||  2 || 2:45
|-  style="background:#cfc;"
| 2012-01-21 || Win ||align=left| Dzhabar Askerov || Yokkao Extreme 2012 || Milan, Italy  ||  Decision|| 3 || 3:00
|-  style="background:#cfc;"
| 2011-12-18 || Win ||align=left| Frank Giorgi || THAI FIGHT 2011 – 70 kg Tournament Final || Bangkok, Thailand ||  Decision|| 3 || 3:00
|-
! style=background:white colspan=9 |
|-  style="background:#cfc;"
| 2011-11-27 || Win ||align=left| Mickaël Piscitello || THAI FIGHT 2011 – 70 kg Tournament Semi-final || Bangkok, Thailand || KO (Right Elbow) || 3 || 
|-  style="background:#cfc;"
| 2011-09-25 || Win ||align=left| Abdallah Mabel || THAI FIGHT 2011 – 70 kg Tournament Quarter-final || Bangkok, Thailand || Decision || 3 || 3:00
|-  style="background:#cfc;"
| 2011-09-02 || Win ||align=left| Warren Stevelmans || Muaythai Premier League: Round 1 || Long Beach, CA United States  || TKO (Referee Stoppage) || 4 ||
|-
! style=background:white colspan=9 |
|-  style="background:#cfc;"
| 2011-08-07 || Win ||align=left| Tomoaki Makino || THAI FIGHT EXTREME 2011: Japan || Ariake Coliseum, Japan || TKO || 2 || 2:49
|-  style="background:#cfc;"
| 2011-07-17 || Win ||align=left| Gilmar China || THAI FIGHT EXTREME 2011: Hong Kong || Hong Kong, China || Unanimous Decision || 3 || 3:00
|-  style="background:#cfc;"
| 2011-05-14 || Win ||align=left| Djime Coulibaly || THAI FIGHT EXTREME 2011: France || Cannes, France || Decision || 3 || 3:00
|-  style="background:#cfc;"
| 2011-02-12 || Win ||align=left| Youssef Boughanem || La Nuit des Titans 6, Palais des Sports || Tours, France || TKO (Dislocated Shoulder)  || 1 || 1:32
|-  style="background:#cfc;"
| 2010-12-30 || Win ||align=left| Hiroki Nakajima || World Victory Road Presents: Soul of Fight || Tokyo, Japan || Decision (Unanimous) || 3 || 3:00
|-  style="background:#cfc;"
| 2010-11-23 || Win ||align=left| Toby Imada || Shoot Boxing World Tournament 2010, Final || Tokyo, Japan || TKO (Low Kick) || 2 ||
|-
! style=background:white colspan=9 |
|-  style="background:#cfc;"
| 2010-11-23 || Win ||align=left| Henry van Opstal || Shoot Boxing World Tournament 2010, Semi Finals || Tokyo, Japan || Decision (Unanimous) || 3 || 3:00
|-  style="background:#cfc;"
| 2010-11-23 || Win ||align=left| Hiroki Shishido || Shoot Boxing World Tournament 2010, Quarter Finals || Tokyo, Japan || Decision (Unanimous) || 3 || 3:00
|-  style="background:#cfc;"
| 2010-06-19 || Win ||align=left| Xu Yan || Wu Lin Feng || Zhengzhou, China || Decision || 3 || 3:00
|-  style="background:#cfc;"
| 2010-05-29 || Win ||align=left| Jordan Watson || MSA Muaythai Premier League 3 || London, England || Decision (Unanimous) || 5 || 3:00 
|-  style="background:#fbb;"
| 2009-10-26 || Loss ||align=left| Andy Souwer || K-1 World MAX 2009 Final, Semi Finals || Yokohama, Japan || Ext. R Decision (Split) || 4 || 3:00
|-  style="background:#cfc;"
| 2009-07-13 || Win ||align=left| Nieky Holzken || K-1 World MAX 2009 Final 8 || Tokyo, Japan || Decision (Unanimous) || 3 || 3:00
|-
! style=background:white colspan=9 |
|-  style="background:#cfc;"
| 2009-06-26 || Win ||align=left| John Wayne Parr || Champions of Champions 2 || Montego Bay, Jamaica || Decision (Unanimous) || 5 || 3:00
|-
! style=background:white colspan=9 |
|-  style="background:#cfc;"
| 2009-04-21 || Win ||align=left| Andre Dida || K-1 World MAX 2009 Final 16 || Fukuoka, Japan || Ext. R Decision (Unanimous) || 4 || 3:00
|-
! style=background:white colspan=9 |
|-  style="background:#fbb;"
| 2008-11-29 || Loss ||align=left| Albert Kraus || It's Showtime 2008 Eindhoven || Eindhoven, Netherlands || Decision || 3 || 3:00
|-  style="background:#cfc;"
| 2008-10-01 || Win ||align=left| Black Mamba || K-1 World MAX 2008 Final, Reserve Fight || Tokyo, Japan || KO (Right Hook) || 1 || 2:18
|-  style="background:#fbb;"
| 2008-07-07 || Loss ||align=left| Yoshihiro Sato || K-1 World MAX 2008 Final 8 || Tokyo, Japan || KO (Knee to the body + right punch) || 3 || 1:50
|-
! style=background:white colspan=9 |
|-  style="background:#cfc;"
| 2008-04-26 || Win ||align=left| Faldir Chahbari || K-1 World Grand Prix 2008 in Amsterdam || Amsterdam, Netherlands || Decision (Split) || 3 || 3:00
|-  style="background:#cfc;"
| 2008-04-09 || Win ||align=left| Albert Kraus || K-1 World MAX 2008 Final 16 || Tokyo, Japan || Ext R. Decision (Unanimous) || 4 || 3:00
|-
! style=background:white colspan=9 |
|-  style="background:#cfc;"
| 2008-02-24 || Win ||align=left| Joon Kim || K-1 Asia MAX 2008 in Seoul || Seoul, Korea || KO (Right Hook) || 2 || 0:37
|-  style="background:#cfc;"
| 2008-02-02 || Win ||align=left| Yoshihiro Sato || K-1 World MAX 2008 Japan Tournament || Tokyo, Japan || Ext R. Decision (Split) || 4 || 3:00
|-  style="background:#fbb;"
| 2007-10-03 || Loss ||align=left| Masato || K-1 World MAX 2007 World Championship Final, Quarter Finals || Tokyo, Japan || Decision (Unanimous) || 3 || 3:00
|-  style="background:#cfc;"
| 2007-06-28 || Win ||align=left| Nieky Holzken || K-1 World MAX 2007 Final Elimination || Tokyo, Japan || Decision (Unanimous) || 3 || 3:00
|-
! style=background:white colspan=9 |
|-  style="background:#c5d2ea;"
| 2007-05-19 || Draw ||align=left| Giorgio Petrosyan || K-1 Scandinavia GP 2007 || Stockholm, Sweden || Decision Draw || 5 || 3:00
|-
! style=background:white colspan=9 |
|-  style="background:#cfc;"
| 2007-04-04 || Win ||align=left| Andy Ologun || K-1 World MAX 2007 World Elite Showcase || Yokohama, Japan || Decision (Unanimous) || 3 || 3:00
|-  style="background:#cfc;"
| 2007-03-17 || Win ||align=left| Dzhabar Askerov || K-1 East Europe MAX 2007 || Vilnius, Lithuania || Decision (Unanimous) || 3 || 3:00
|-  style="background:#cfc;"
| 2007-02-05 || Win ||align=left| Tsogto Amara || K-1 World MAX 2007 Japan Tournament || Tokyo, Japan || Decision (Unanimous) || 3 || 3:00
|-  style="background:#cfc;"
| 2006-11-24 || Win ||align=left| Ole Laursen || K-1 World MAX North European Qualification 2007 || Stockholm, Sweden || TKO (Referee Stoppage)|| 2 || 2:49
|-  style="background:#cfc;"
| 2006-09-04 || Win ||align=left| Hiroki Shishido || K-1 World MAX 2006 Champions' Challenge || Tokyo, Japan || KO (Left Hook) || 1 || 0:15
|-  style="background:#cfc;"
| 2006-06-30 || Win ||align=left| Andy Souwer || K-1 World MAX 2006 World Championship Final, Final || Yokohama, Japan || TKO (Right Cross/3 Knockdowns) || 2 || 2:13
|-
! style=background:white colspan=9 |
|-  style="background:#cfc;"
| 2006-06-30 || Win ||align=left| Gago Drago || K-1 World MAX 2006 World Championship Final, Semi Finals || Yokohama, Japan || Decision (Unanimous) || 3 || 3:00
|-  style="background:#cfc;"
| 2006-06-30 || Win ||align=left| Yoshihiro Sato || K-1 World MAX 2006 World Championship Final, Quarter Finals || Yokohama, Japan || KO (Left Hook) || 2 || 0:18
|-  style="background:#c5d2ea;"
| 2006-05-26 || Draw ||align=left| Morad Sari || K-1 Rules "Le Grand Tournoi" 2006 || Paris, France || Decision || 5 || 3:00
|-  style="background:#cfc;"
| 2006-04-05 || Win ||align=left| Virgil Kalakoda || K-1 World MAX 2006 World Tournament Open || Tokyo, Japan || Ext R. Decision (Split) || 4 || 3:00
|-
! style=background:white colspan=9 |
|-  style="background:#cfc;"
| 2006-03-19 || Win ||align=left| Marco Pique || SLAMM "Nederland vs Thailand" || Almere, Netherlands || Decision (Unanimous) || 5 || 3:00
|-  style="background:#cfc;"
| 2006-02-18 || Win ||align=left| Jomhod Kiatadisak || WMC Explosion III || Stockholm, Sweden || KO (Right Hook to the body) || 2 || 3:00
|-
! style=background:white colspan=9 |
|-  style="background:#cfc;"
| 2006-02-04 || Win ||align=left| Mike Zambidis || K-1 World MAX 2006 Japan Tournament || Saitama, Japan || Decision (Unanimous) || 3 || 3:00
|-  style="background:#cfc;"
| 2005-11-05 || Win ||align=left| Youssef Akhnikh || Muay Thai || Trieste, Italy || TKO (Corner Stoppage) || 1 || 3:00
|-  style="background:#cfc;"
| 2005-09-09 || Win ||align=left| Jean-Charles Skarbowsky || Xplosion Hong Kong || Hong Kong || Decision (Unanimous) || 5 || 3:00
|-
! style=background:white colspan=9 |
|-  style="background:#fbb;"
| 2005-07-20 || Loss ||align=left| Andy Souwer || K-1 World MAX 2005 Championship Final, Final || Yokohama, Japan || 2 Ext R. Decision (Split) || 5 || 3:00
|-
! style=background:white colspan=9 |
|-  style="background:#cfc;"
| 2005-07-20 || Win ||align=left| Albert Kraus || K-1 World MAX 2005 Championship Final, Semi Finals || Yokohama, Japan || Decision (Unanimous) || 3 || 3:00
|-  style="background:#cfc;"
| 2005-07-20 || Win ||align=left| Jadamba Narantungalag || K-1 World MAX 2005 Championship Final, Quarter Finals || Yokohama, Japan || Decision (Majority) || 3 || 3:00
|-  style="background:#cfc;"
| 2005-05-04 || Win ||align=left| Vasily Shish || K-1 World MAX 2005 World Tournament Open || Tokyo, Japan || Decision (Unanimous) || 3 || 3:00
|-
! style=background:white colspan=9 |
|-  style="background:#cfc;"
| 2005-04-01 || Win ||align=left| Kieran Keddle || Thailand Boxing Sport Board "Muaythai Cultural Festival 2005" || Bangkok, Thailand  || Decision || 4 || 3:00
|-  style="background:#fbb;"
| 2005-02-23 || Loss ||align=left| Albert Kraus || K-1 World MAX 2005 Japan Tournament || Tokyo, Japan || Ext R. Decision (Split) || 4 || 3:00
|-  style="background:#cfc;"
| 2004-11-06 || Win ||align=left| Katsumori Maita || Titans 1st || Kitakyushu, Japan || TKO (Corner Stoppage) || 2 || 1:26
|-  style="background:#cfc;"
| 2004-10-13 || Win ||align=left| Kozo Takeda || K-1 World MAX 2004 Champions' Challenge || Tokyo, Japan || 2 Ext R. Decision (Unanimous) || 5 || 3:00
|-  style="background:#cfc;"
| 2004-07-07 || Win ||align=left| Masato || K-1 World MAX 2004 World Tournament Final, Final || Tokyo, Japan || Ext R. Decision (Unanimous) || 4 || 3:00
|-
! style=background:white colspan=9 |
|-  style="background:#cfc;"
| 2004-07-07 || Win ||align=left| Takayuki Kohiruimaki || K-1 World MAX 2004 World Tournament Final, Semi Final || Tokyo, Japan || KO (Knee Strikes) || 2 || 0:42
|-  style="background:#cfc;"
| 2004-07-07 || Win ||align=left| John Wayne Parr || K-1 World MAX 2004 World Tournament Final, Quarter Finals || Tokyo, Japan || Ext R. Decision (Split) || 4 || 3:00
|-  style="background:#cfc;"
| 2004-05-20 || Win ||align=left| Munkong Kiatsomkuan || Kiatsingnoi Fights, Rajadamnern Stadium || Bangkok, Thailand || Decision (Unanimous) || 5 || 3:00
|-  style="background:#cfc;"
| 2004-04-07 || Win ||align=left| Jordan Tai || K-1 World MAX 2004 World Tournament Open || Tokyo, Japan || Decision (Unanimous) || 3 || 3:00
|-
! style=background:white colspan=9 |
|-  style="background:#cfc;"
| 2004-03-21 || Win ||align=left| Fuji Chalmsak || Magnum 4, NJKF || Tokyo, Japan || Decision (Majority) || 3 || 3:00
|-  style="background:#cfc;"
| 2003-11-18 || Win ||align=left| Khunsuk Petchsupapan || P.Pramuk Fights, Lumpinee Stadium || Bangkok, Thailand || Decision (Unanimous) || 5 || 3:00
|-  style="background:#cfc;"
| 2003-10-10 || Win ||align=left| Sun Tao || Chinese police VS Thai police kickboxing Championship || Guangzhou, China || TKO (Corner Stoppage) || 2 || 1:25
|-  style="background:#cfc;"
| 2003-08-31 || Win ||align=left| Timor Daal || K.O.M.A. "King of Martial Arts" GP || Seoul, Korea || KO (Left Elbow) || 3 || 1:42

|-  style="background:#cfc;"
| 2003-05-31 || Win ||align=left| Khunsuk Petchsupapan || Omnoi Stadium|| Bangkok, Thailand || Decision  || 5 || 3:00

|-  style="background:#cfc;"
| 2003-04-08 || Win ||align=left| Nontachai Kiatwanlop || Lumpinee Stadium || Bangkok, Thailand || TKO || 3 || 
|-  style="background:#cfc;"
| 2002-12-14 || Win ||align=left| Satoshi Kobayashi || D4D Toyota Cup, Final Lumpinee Stadium || Bangkok, Thailand || Decision (Unanimous) || 3 || 3:00
|-
! style=background:white colspan=9 |
|-  style="background:#cfc;"
| 2002-12-14 || Win ||align=left| Khunsuk Petchsupapan || D4D Toyota Cup, Semi Finals Lumpinee Stadium || Bangkok, Thailand || Decision (Unanimous) || 3 || 3:00
|-  style="background:#cfc;"
| 2002-12-14 || Win ||align=left| Samranchai 96 Penang || D4D Toyota Cup, Quarter Finals Lumpinee Stadium || Bangkok, Thailand || Decision (Unanimous) || 3 || 3:00
|-  style="background:#cfc;"
| 2002-11-22 || Win ||align=left| Tongchai Por Prabaht || P.Pramuk Fights, Lumpinee Stadium || Bangkok, Thailand || KO(Right High Kick) || 2 || 
|-  style="background:#fbb;"
| 2002-10-26 || Loss ||align=left| Pethnamek Sor Siriwat || Lumpinee Stadium || Bangkok, Thailand || Decision || 5 || 3:00
|-  style="background:#c5d2ea;"
| 2002-09-12 || Draw ||align=left| Thewaritnoi S.K.V. Gym || Lumpinee Stadium || Bangkok, Thailand || Draw || 5 || 3:00
|-  style="background:#cfc;"
| 2002 || Win ||align=left| Panpetch ||  || Bangkok, Thailand || TKO || 3 || 
|-  style="background:#cfc;"
| 2002 || Win ||align=left| Khunsuk Petchsupapan || Omnoi Stadium || Bangkok, Thailand || Decision || 5 || 3:00 
|-
! style=background:white colspan=9 |
|-  style="background:#fbb;"
| 2002-05-10 || Loss|| align="left" | Orono Majestic Gym || Lumpinee Stadium || Bangkok, Thailand || Decision || 5 || 3:00
|-  style="background:#cfc;"
| 2002-04-21 || Win ||align=left| Mikitada Igarashi || J-Network "J-Bloods" || Tokyo, Japan || TKO (Doctor Stoppage) || 3 || 0:47
|-  style="background:#cfc;"
| 2002-03-29 || Win ||align=left| Panpetch || Lumpinee Stadium || Bangkok, Thailand || Decision || 5 || 3:00
|-  style="background:#fbb;"
| 2002-01-05 || Loss ||align=left| Sattaban Tor. Rattanakiat || Lumpinee Stadium || Bangkok, Thailand || Decision || 5 || 3:00
|-  style="background:#fbb;"
| 2001-12-07 || Loss ||align=left| Charlie Sor Chaitamin || Lumpinee 45th Anniversary, Lumpinee Stadium || Bangkok, Thailand || Decision || 5 || 3:00
|-
! style=background:white colspan=9 |
|-  style="background:#fbb;"
| 2001-10-06 || Loss ||align=left| Tewaritnoi S.K.V. Gym || Lumpinee Stadium || Bangkok, Thailand || Decision || 5 || 3:00
|-  style="background:#fbb;"
| 2001-08-07 || Loss|| align="left" | Orono Majestic Gym || Lumpinee Stadium || Bangkok, Thailand || Decision || 5 || 3:00
|-  style="background:#cfc;"
| 2001-07-14 || Win ||align=left| PetchArun Sor Ploenjit || Lumpinee Stadium || Bangkok, Thailand || Decision || 5 || 3:00
|-  style="background:#cfc;"
| 2001-06-29 || Win ||align=left| Sinchainoi Sor Kittichai || Seangmaurakot Fights, Lumpinee Stadium || Bangkok, Thailand || KO(Left High Kick) || 4 ||
|-
! style=background:white colspan=9 |
|-  style="background:#cfc;"
| 2001-05-19 || Win ||align=left| Pethek Sor.Suwanpakdee || Omnoi Stadium || Bangkok, Thailand || Decision || 5 || 3:00
|-
! style=background:white colspan=9 |
|-  style="background:#cfc;"
| 2001 || Win ||align=left| Sakchai Saksoonton || Lumpinee Stadium || Bangkok, Thailand || Decision || 5 || 3:00
|-  style="background:#cfc;"
| 2001-03-30 || Win ||align=left| Mangkornyok Mor Somnuk || Lumpinee Stadium || Bangkok, Thailand || KO (Right Elbow) || 3 || 
|-  style="background:#cfc;"
| 2001 || Win ||align=left| Petarung Sor Suwanpakdee || Lumpinee Stadium || Bangkok, Thailand || Decision (Unanimous) || 5 || 3:00
|-  style="background:#fbb;"
| 2001-01-21 || Loss||align=left| Mahakarn Por. Pongsawang||  Channel 7 Stadium || Bangkok, Thailand || Decision  || 5 || 3:00
|-  style="background:#fbb;"
| 2000-08-11 || Loss||align=left| Dokmaifai TorSitthichai||  Fairtex, Lumpinee Stadium || Bangkok, Thailand || Decision  || 5 || 3:00

|-  style="background:#cfc;"
| 2000-06-17 || Win ||align=left| Hongthong Na.Muengkao|| Omnoi Stadium || Bangkok, Thailand || Decision || 5 || 3:00

|-  style="background:#cfc;"
| 2000-05-29 || Win ||align=left| Verhard lookphabath || Rajadamnern Stadium || Bangkok, Thailand || KO (Elbow) || 4 || 
|-  style="background:#cfc;"
| 2000-04-07 || Win ||align=left| Sakwitoon Royal Map Ta Phut || P.Pramuk Fights, Lumpinee Stadium || Bangkok, Thailand || Decision  || 5 || 3:00
|-  style="background:#fbb;"
| 2000-03-14 || Loss||align=left| Krairat Por.Paoin||  Lumpinee Stadium || Bangkok, Thailand || Decision  || 5 || 3:00
|-  style="background:#fbb;"
| 2000-02-01 || Loss||align=left| Sot Looknongyangtoy||  Lumpinee Stadium || Bangkok, Thailand || Decision  || 5 || 3:00
|-  style="background:#cfc;"
| 2000-01-07 || Win ||align=left| Komtae Fairtex || P.Pramuk Fights, Lumpinee Stadium || Bangkok, Thailand || Decision (Unanimous) || 5 || 3:00
|-  style="background:#cfc;"
| 2000-01-01 || Win ||align=left| Sakadpetch Sor. Sakunpan || Omnoi Stadium || Bangkok, Thailand || KO (Right Elbow) || 3 ||
|-  style="background:#cfc;"
|  || Win ||align=left| Seelaa Tor Bangsean || 	Channel 7 Stadium || Bangkok, Thailand || Decision (Unanimous) || 5 || 3:00
|-  style="background:#cfc;"
| 1999-11-02 || Win ||align=left| Fahsitong Wor.Thaweekat ||  Lumpinee Stadium || Bangkok, Thailand || Decision  || 5 || 3:00
|-  style="background:#fbb;"
| 1999-09-17 || Loss||align=left| Rattanasak Kratindaeng||  Lumpinee Stadium || Bangkok, Thailand || Decision  || 5 || 3:00
|-  style="background:#cfc;"
| 1999-07-04 || Win ||align=left| Anusorn Luksurtatarn ||   || Bangkok, Thailand || Decision  || 5 || 3:00
|-
| colspan=9 | Legend:

Bare knuckle boxing record

|-
|Win
|align=center|1–0
|Erkan Varol
|KO (punches)
|BKFC Thailand 3
|
|align=center|1
|align=center|1:50
|Bangkok, Thailand 
|
|-

Filmography

See also
List of K-1 events
List of K-1 champions
List of male kickboxers

References

External links
 Buakaw Banchamek's official facebook

1982 births
Living people
Featherweight kickboxers
Lightweight kickboxers
Muay Thai trainers
Buakaw Banchamek
Welterweight kickboxers
Buakaw Banchamek
Buakaw Banchamek
Association football forwards
Buakaw Banchamek
Buakaw Banchamek
Kunlun Fight kickboxers
Buakaw Banchamek
Buakaw Banchamek
Kunlun Fight Muay Thai champions